Philippines AirAsia, Inc. is a low-cost airline based at Ninoy Aquino International Airport in Metro Manila in the Philippines. The airline is the Philippine affiliate of AirAsia, a low-cost airline based in Malaysia. The airline started as a joint venture among three Filipino investors and AirAsia Investments Ltd. (later AirAsia Aviation Limited), a subsidiary of AirAsia Berhad.

History

AirAsia Philippines was formally launched on 16 December 2010. On 15 August 2011, AirAsia Philippines took delivery of its first brand-new Airbus A320 aircraft. The airline planned to start operations by 2011 but was delayed due to the long duration of processing the new requirements instituted in 2008.

On 7 February 2012, the airline received its air operator certificate. The airline commenced operations on 28 March 2012 by launching flights from its base at Clark International Airport to Kalibo and Davao City. It partnered with Victory Liner, one of the largest provincial bus companies operating in the Philippines, to provide free shuttle service for inbound and outbound passengers of Clark International Airport. Within that year, in addition to its first two destinations, AirAsia Philippines launched flights to Puerto Princesa, Kuala Lumpur, Hong Kong, Singapore, and Taipei.

On 11 March 2013, an agreement was made between AirAsia Philippines to swap shares with Philippine-based airline Zest Airways. Zest Airways received a mix of $16 million cash and a 13% share in AirAsia Philippines, while AirAsia Philippines now owns 85% of Zest Airways, with 49% of its voting rights. The deal closed on 10 May 2013. The agreement also gives AirAsia Philippines access to Ninoy Aquino International Airport, allowing further growth of its route network. By October 2013, AirAsia Philippines closed its clark hub and moved its operations to its new Manila hub.

In 2015, AirAsia Zest merged with AirAsia Philippines. Following the merger, the newly consolidated airline was renamed as Philippines AirAsia. It operated under the former AirAsia Zest air operator's certificate, resulting in the airline's IATA code change from PQ to Z2, while the ICAO code remained unchanged. Its expansion continued by adding more destinations, reopening its Clark hub in March 2017, and the launch of more secondary bases in the Philippines.

The COVID-19 pandemic has adversely affected Philippines AirAsia's business. Plans for Philippines AirAsia to debut in the Philippine Stock Exchange within 2020 was deferred in March 2020, with the airline management deciding to focus on expanding its domestic operations after a government ban on China and South Korea in response to the worsening health situation threatened 30% of the airlines' revenue.

As travel restrictions ease in 2022, Philippines AirAsia started to rebuild its network by adding more flights, launching flights to Dumaguete and Roxas City, and resuming most international flights starting 27 May 2022. On 1 February 2023, it launched daily flights to Tokyo. As China, being an important market for tourism in the Philippines, lifted travel restrictions, Philippines AirAsia is expected to resume weekly flights to Guangzhou, Shenzhen, and Macau from February to March 2023.

Corporate affairs
The airline is headquartered at the RedPoint office at the Ninoy Aquino International Airport Terminal 3 in Pasay, Metro Manila. RedPoint has been the airline's headquarters since October 2019; the airline was previously headquartered at the Salem Complex near NAIA Terminal 4.

The airline is a joint venture between three Filipino businessmen and AirAsia. 60% of the airline is owned by Filipino investors Antonio O. Cojuangco, Jr., former owner of Associated Broadcasting Company and owner of Dream Satellite TV, Michael L. Romero, a real estate developer and port operator, and Marianne Hontiveros, a former music industry executive and TV host. The remaining 40% is owned by AirAsia Investments Ltd. (later AirAsia Aviation Limited) of Malaysia. The Public Service Act of the Philippines, prior to its amendment in 2022, only allowed a foreign direct investment of up to 40% in Philippine-registered airlines.

Destinations

Fleet

, the Philippines AirAsia fleet consists of the following aircraft:

Sports teams
 AirAsia Philippine Patriots (ASEAN Basketball League, 2010–2012)
 AirAsia Flying Spikers (Philippine Super Liga, 2014)

See also
 List of airlines of the Philippines
 List of airports in the Philippines
 List of companies of the Philippines
 List of low-cost airlines
 Transportation in the Philippines

References

External links
 

Airlines of the Philippines
Airlines established in 2010
AirAsia
Companies based in Pasay
Low-cost carriers
Philippine companies established in 2010